The GP Erik Breukink was a multi-day road cycling held annually in the Netherlands in 2002 and 2003. 

It is named after Erik Breukink, a former professional cyclist.

Winners

References

Cycle races in the Netherlands
Recurring sporting events established in 2002
Recurring sporting events disestablished in 2003
2002 establishments in the Netherlands
Defunct cycling races in the Netherlands